Jamhuri Stadium may refer to:

 Jamhuri Stadium (Morogoro), a stadium in Morogoro, Tanzania, home to Moro United football club
 Jamhuri Stadium (Dodoma), a stadium in Dodoma, Tanzania, home to JKT Ruvu Stars and Polisi Dodoma football clubs